Reigning champion Fred Perry defeated Wilmer Allison 6–4, 6–3, 3–6, 1–6, 8–6 in the final to win the men's singles tennis title at the 1934 U.S. National Championships.

Seeds
The tournament used two lists of players for seeding the men's singles event; one for U.S. players and one for foreign players. Fred Perry is the champion; others show the round in which they were eliminated. 

U.S.

  Frank Shields (quarterfinals)
  Wilmer Allison (finalist)
  Sidney Wood (semifinals)
  Berkeley Bell (fourth round)
  Lester Stoefen (quarterfinals)
  Frank Parker (quarterfinals)
  Bryan Grant (third round)
  George Lott (third round)

Foreign
  Fred Perry (champion)
  Roderich Menzel (fourth round)
  Vernon Kirby (semifinals)
  Frank Wilde (third round)

Draw

Key
 Q = Qualifier
 WC = Wild card
 LL = Lucky loser
 r = Retired

Finals

Earlier rounds

Section 1

Section 2

Section 3

Section 4

Section 5

Section 6

Section 7

Section 8

References

External links
 1934 U.S. National Championships on ITFtennis.com, the source for this draw

Men's Singles
1934